Haga Kashif Badri is a Sudanese women's rights activist, one of the pioneer women in Sudanese education.

Education 
Born in Omdurman, Haga completed her primary, intermediate and secondary education in Omdurman. She attained her Bachelor of Arts from Khartoum University College (1956) and her M.Sc. in history from Cairo University (1977).

Work 
From 1956 to 1958 Haga Kashif Badri was Assistant Information Officer, Ministry of Culture and Information. She left the role for political reasons. From 1960 to 1963 she taught at the Al - Mahdi Secondary School for Girls, before teaching at a High school in Ethiopia for five years.

President of the Social Welfare Council with the rank of Minister (1980). Issued a booklet (Khalil Alshaer ) 1954. Feminist movement in Sudan (Book) University of Khartoum Publishing 2002. The Cultural Caravan magazine was published in 1956.

Publication and books 
Haga Kashif Badri has written educational articles in the educational documentation magazine, and articles on women's issues in Al-Sarha newspaper. She was a reporter for the Italian newspaper Al Rai in Italy for four years.

References

Sudanese women's rights activists
Year of birth missing (living people)
Living people
People from Omdurman